Corcoran High School is a public high school located in Syracuse, New York, having approximately 1800 students. In 2005, it became a member of the International Baccalaureate Diploma Program. It is one of the top 1000 ranked schools in the country as of 2009, but has been in the top 600 (2007). The principal is Daniel Straub.

Facilities
The facilities at Corcoran High School consist of 71 classrooms, a library, four computer labs, an auditorium, two gymnasiums, a weight room, a pool and a state of the art outdoor athletic stadium.

Drama

The Corcoran Association of Student Theatre (commonly referred to as C.A.S.T.) is an extracurricular performing troupe run cooperatively by faculty advisors with the input of a student executive board. The Corcoran Association of Student Theatre prides itself as one of the only high school programs in Central New York to boast a full length theatre season, on par with the offerings of many local community and semi-pro theatres.

Athletics

Corcoran participates in the Section 3 region of the New York State Public High School Athletic Association in the Central New York Counties League (CNYCL) (for most sports) in the AA division. In August 2007 Corcoran and 12 other high schools in Section 3 left the Onondaga High School League (OHSL) and joined the newly formed CNYCL.

Baseball Section 3 Championships- 1968, 1970, 1973
-League Championships- 1968, 1969, 1972, 1980, 1983, 1987, 1988, 1997, 1999, 2004

Boys Basketball Regional Championships- 1981, 1989, 2000
-Section 3 Championships- 1967, 1970, 1981, 1989, 1998, 2000
-League Championships- 1980, 1983, 1993, 1995, 1998, 1999, 2000, 2001, 2005, 2009, 2010

Girls Basketball New York State Championships- 1993, 1998
-Regional Championships- 1982, 1993, 1998, 2000, 2008
-Section 3 Championships- 1982, 1991, 1992, 1993, 1994, 1996, 1997, 1998, 1999, 2008
-League Championships- 1978, 1980, 1983, 1991, 1992, 1995, 1996, 1997, 1998, 2000, 2002, 2003, 2004, 2005, 2009, 2010, 2011

Football Regional Championships-1994, 1995, 2003
-Section 3 Championships- 1991, 1994, 1995, 2002, 2003
-League Championships-1971, 1979, 1991, 1992, 1994, 1995, 1999, 2000, 2001, 2002, 2007, 2009

Boys Cross Country New York State Championships- 1979, 1986, 1990, 1992, 1993
-Section 3 Championships- 1979, 1980, 1981, 1982, 1986, 1989, 1990, 1992, 1993, 2004
-League Championships- 1981, 1983, 1984, 1986, 1987, 1988, 1989, 1990, 1991, 1992, 1993, 1994, 1995

Girls Cross Country League Championships- 1994, 1995
Boys Gymnastics Section 3 Championships- 1981, 1982, 1986, 1987
-League Championships- 1986, 1988

Ice Hockey Section 3 Championship-1990
-League Championships- 2000, 2001, 2009

Boys Indoor Track Section 3 Championships- 1981, 1986, 1987, 1988, 1989, 1990, 1992, 1994, 1995
-League Championships- 1988, 1991, 1995, 1996, 2000, 2010, 2011, 2014

Girls Indoor Track  League Championship- 1995, 2014
Boys Lacrosse League Championship- 2009
Boys Outdoor Track Section 3 Championships- 1990, 1991, 1995, 1996

-League Championships- 1982, 1985, 1986, 1987, 1988, 1995, 1996, 2009

Girls Outdoor Track League Championship- 1996
Girls Soccer League Championship- 1976
Softball Section 3 Championship- 1985
-League Championships- 1980, 1981, 1983, 1984, 1985, 1986, 1988

Volleyball League Championships- 1980, 1983
Wrestling League Championships- 2010

Notable alumni
Jimmy Collins (1967), Retired NBA player, former head coach of the University of Illinois at Chicago men's basketball team
Craig Shirley (1974), The New York Times bestselling author
Joanie Mahoney (1983), Lawyer, Chief Operating Officer, former Onondaga County Executive
Martin Sexton (1984), Singer, Songwriter
Moody McCarthy (1984), Comedian
Jason Stanley (1986), Jacob Urowsky Professor of Philosophy at Yale University (formerly Rutgers, Cornell, Michigan, and Oxford)
Will Allen (1996), NFL cornerback for the Miami Dolphins
Jeanette J. Epps (1988) Astronaut,  first African-American woman assigned to board the International Space Station
Jamel Richardson (2001), CFL wide receiver for the Montreal Alouettes
Jo-Lonn Dunbar (2003), NFL linebacker for the New Orleans Saints
Bob Swan, CEO of Intel

References

Public high schools in New York (state)
Schools in Onondaga County, New York
Syracuse City School District